A Wesleyan is any person who adopts the principles of Wesleyan theology or Wesleyanism.

Wesleyan may also refer to:
Wesleyan University or one of the many universities and liberal arts colleges named after John Wesley
Wesleyan University Press, a university press
 Wesley College (disambiguation), a number of educational institutions worldwide
 The theological emphasis on sanctification, characteristic of the holiness movement of which Wesley was part
 The Wesleyan Church split from the Methodist Episcopal Church in 1843
 Wesleyan Methodist Church (Great Britain)
 The Wesleyan Assurance Society, a large financial services company originally founded by the Wesleyan Methodist Church in 1841
 Many other churches bear the name of Wesleyan Church. See Wesleyan Church (disambiguation)

The term is also used as a general synonym for Methodist.